Edwin Arturo Congo Murillo (born 7 October 1976) is a Colombian retired professional footballer who played as a forward.

Basing his game in physical display, he played most of his professional career in Spain, appearing for a host of clubs in various league levels and amassing league totals of 164 matches and 33 goals (44 games and three goals in La Liga) over eight seasons.

Congo represented Real Madrid amongst others, without any impact as he was loaned for most of the duration of his contract.

Club career
After impressive performances with Once Caldas, Bogotá-born Congo was acquired by La Liga giants Real Madrid in 1999. However, he would not register one single league appearance for the capital side during his stay there (his only season was 2001–02), while also serving loans to Real Valladolid, Vitória S.C. and Toulouse FC.

Congo's most steady period in Spain, and abroad overall, was lived at Levante UD – two top flight promotions, with eight goals scored in the 2003–04 campaign – while he also netted 11 in 2006–07 for Sporting de Gijón also in the second division.

In 2007–08, Congo had an uneventful Spanish top flight stint with Recreativo de Huelva, being released at the end of the season. With the following campaign already started, he decided to join CD Olímpic de Xàtiva in the Valencian regional championships as he was residing in the area, while also trying to keep himself fit while waiting for an offer from a mid-to-high level team in Europe. He scored three times in his first two matches.

Congo retired from football in 2009 at the age of 33, after another brief spell in amateur football also in Spain.

International career
A Colombian international, Congo represented the nation at the 1999 and 2004 Copa América tournaments, being capped a total of 17 times.

Personal life
In May 2020, Congo was arrested in Spain for his alleged part in a drugs trafficking operation. He denied accusations and was released after being questioned by Spanish police.

References

External links

1976 births
Living people
Footballers from Bogotá
Colombian footballers
Association football forwards
Categoría Primera A players
Once Caldas footballers
La Liga players
Segunda División players
Real Madrid CF players
Real Valladolid players
Levante UD footballers
Sporting de Gijón players
Recreativo de Huelva players
CD Olímpic de Xàtiva footballers
Primeira Liga players
Vitória S.C. players
Ligue 1 players
Toulouse FC players
Colombia international footballers
1999 Copa América players
2000 CONCACAF Gold Cup players
2004 Copa América players
Colombian expatriate footballers
Expatriate footballers in Spain
Expatriate footballers in Portugal
Expatriate footballers in France
Colombian expatriate sportspeople in Spain
Colombian expatriate sportspeople in Portugal
Colombian expatriate sportspeople in France